This article shows Sporting CP's player statistics and all matches that the club played during the 2017–18 season.

Players

Current squad

Out on loan

Transfers

Transfers in

Transfers out

Pre-season and friendlies

Competitions

Overview

Primeira Liga

On 5 July 2017, Liga Portuguesa de Futebol Profissional announced nine stipulations for the Liga NOS fixture draw that took place on 7 July. Among previous conditions, two new were added, the two teams who will play the Supertaça could not play against Sporting CP (Portuguese team in the play-off round of Champions League) on the first two matchdays.

League table

Results by round

Tied with FC Porto at matchday 3.

Matches

Taça de Portugal

Third round

Fourth round

Round of 16

Quarter-finals

Semi-finals

1–1 on aggregate. Sporting CP won 5–4 on penalties.

Final

Taça da Liga

Group stage

Semi-finals

Final

UEFA Champions League

Play-off round

Group stage

UEFA Europa League

Round of 32

Round of 16

Quarter-finals

Statistics

Appearances and goals
Last updated on 18 May 2019

|-
! colspan=16 style=background:#dcdcdc; text-align:center|Goalkeepers

|-
! colspan=16 style=background:#dcdcdc; text-align:center|Defenders

|-
! colspan=16 style=background:#dcdcdc; text-align:center|Midfielders

|-
! colspan=16 style=background:#dcdcdc; text-align:center|Forwards

|-
! colspan=16 style=background:#dcdcdc; text-align:center| Players who have made an appearance or had a squad number this season but have been loaned out or transferred

|}

Clean sheets

References

External links
 Official club website 

Sporting CP seasons
Sporting
Sporting Lisbon